Trichalcidion penicillum is a species of beetle in the family Cerambycidae, the only species in the genus Trichalcidion.

References

Acanthocinini